The 2015–16 Süper Lig (known as the Spor Toto Süper Lig for sponsorship reasons) is the 58th season of the Süper Lig, the highest tier football league of Turkey.

The season was named after Hasan Doğan, a former president of the Turkish Football Federation, who died in 2008.

Teams 
Kayserispor, Osmanlıspor and Antalyaspor promoted from 2014–15 TFF First League.
Balıkesirspor, Karabükspor and Kayseri Erciyesspor relegated to 2015–16 TFF First League.

Stadia and locations

Personnel and sponsorship

Managerial changes

League table

Results

Positions by round 
The following table represents the teams position after each round in the competition.

Results by round
The following table represents the teams game results in each round.

Attendances

Statistics

Top goalscorers

Top assists

Hat-tricks

Clean sheets

Player

Club
 Most clean sheets: 17
Fenerbahçe

See also
 2015–16 Turkish Cup
 2015–16 TFF First League
 2015–16 TFF Second League
 2015–16 TFF Third League

References

External links
 

2015-16
Turk
1